Banda Blanca is a Honduran musical group formed in 1971. They began as a rock band but eventually integrated elements of merengue and punta rock into their music. The group rose to fame in 1990, when their song "Sopa de Caracol" became an international success, peaking at number one on the Billboard Top Latin Songs in the United States. Their songs "Fiesta" and "Swing Latino" also reached the American charts. Their album Baila Blanca became a number-one hit on the Tropical Albums chart. In 1991, they received a Lo Nuestro award in the category Tropical – New Artist of the Year.

Band members
 Julio Ardón – lead vocals
 Óscar Gerardo Galindo  – bass guitar
 Juan Pompilio Tejeda Duarte – keyboards, backing vocals
 José Luis Rodríguez – drums
 Héctor Altamirano – guitar, backing vocals
 Adán Rodríguez – piano, keyboards, backing vocals

Selected discography

 ¡Fiesta Inolvidable! Vol. 1 (1982)
 Sopa de Caracol (1990)
 Fiesta Tropical (1991)
 Alegría (1992)
 Swing Latino (1994)
 Hot, Hot, Hot (2000)
 Saben Quien Llego (2015)

See also
 Music of Honduras

References

Musical groups established in 1971
Garifuna music
Honduran musicians